Mercanlı is a village in the Elbeyli District, Kilis Province, Turkey. The village is inhabited by Turkmens of the Barak tribe and had a population of 39 in 2022.

References

Villages in Elbeyli District